Kazakhstan Volleyball Federation (KVF) is the governing body for volleyball in Kazakhstan. It was founded in 1992, and has been a member of FIVB. It is also a member of the Asian Volleyball Confederation. The VFRK is responsible for organizing the Kazakhstan men's national volleyball team and Kazakhstan women's national volleyball team.

References

External links
 

Kazakhstan
Volleyball in Kazakhstan
Volleyball